Norman Lee was a British film director.

Norman Lee may also refer to:

Norm Lee Australian politician
Norman Lee (musician)